Robert Walls (born 21 July 1950) is a former Australian rules footballer who represented  and  in the Victorian Football League (VFL) during the 1960s and 1970s. In a playing career that spanned three decades Robert played a combined 259 games and kicked a total of 444 goals. Throughout the 1980s and 1990s he continued to coach in the VFL/AFL for a total of 347 games across four different clubs. As a coach, his greatest achievement came in 1987 when he coached Carlton to the 1987 VFL premiership, the same club he won premierships with as player in 1968, 1970 and 1972. After his coaching career ended, Walls became involved in the AFL media as a commentator and columnist. Walls was also a grade 6 teacher at Park Orchards Primary School at the time that he was head coach at Fitzroy.

Playing career

Carlton 
Walls grew up in Brunswick, Victoria and was educated at Coburg High School. He initially supported  like his mother, but ended up at  because Brunswick at that time was part of Carlton's recruiting zone. He was recruited from Coburg Amateurs by the Carlton Football Club and made his senior VFL debut with them as a tall, skinny 16-year-old on 22 April 1967 against Hawthorn at Princes Park. He gave a sign of things to come when he scored a goal with his first kick. Walls would go on to play in three premierships with Carlton – in 1968, 1970 and 1972. He was judged Man of the Match in the 1972 VFL Grand Final when he kicked six goals against arch-rivals Richmond in a masterful display. As the Norm Smith Medal was not awarded until the 1979 VFL Grand Final, Robert was not awarded the medal. He played 218 games and scored 367 goals for Carlton before obtaining a clearance to Fitzroy midway through the 1978 season.

Fitzroy 
Walls made his Fitzroy debut in round 9 of the 1978 season, where he kicked 2 goals in a losing effort against Footscray. He went on to play 14 games in his first season at Fitzroy, kicking 24 goals. Walls' stint with the club was marred by a combination of poor form and injury issues. In Round 17 of the 1980 season against  at Windy Hill, Walls injured his knee in the third quarter and had to be carried off.

Coaching career

Fitzroy 
After he retired as a player, Walls replaced Bill Stephen as senior coach of the Fitzroy in 1981. Walls first task was a major clean-out of older players who were clearly "past it" after the club's disappointing 1980 season, Walls lifted the Lions to their best era since winning a premiership in 1944. Walls would coach Fitzroy Football Club from 1981-1985 for 115 games (60 wins – 54 losses – 1 draw).

They improved from last in 1980 to fifth at the end of the home-and-away season in 1981, securing their finals berth with an upset win over Collingwood and then beating Essendon in the Elimination Final before failing by the narrowest of margins in the First Semi against the Magpies. 1982 was relatively disappointing due to a poor start, but with players like Gary Pert and Paul Roos from the club's recruiting zones and South Australian recruit Matt Rendell growing into stars, the Lions were back as a force at the end of the season. 1983 saw the Lions emerge after five rounds as favourites for the premiership and maintain that favouritism with a sensational win in a top-of-the-table clash with North Melbourne by 150 points with Rendell kicking eight goals besides destroying Gary Dempsey in the ruck. However, inevitable overconfidence saw the Lions lose form and finish fourth after losing two hard-fought finals.

1984, with injuries plaguing the club and its lack of depth apparent, was initially disappointing but a remarkable recovery saw them enter the five after the final round only to be crushed by Collingwood. In 1985, the Lions' financial crisis emerged to threaten their future and this, along with more injuries, caused them to drop to ninth with only seven wins and two losses to last-placed St Kilda. After this, Walls moved to his former club Carlton in a swap with David Parkin in a jointly announced agreement between Fitzroy Football Club and Carlton Football Club to swap senior coaches. Walls was then replaced by David Parkin as Fitzroy Football Club  senior coach.

Carlton 
Walls became senior coach of Carlton in 1986, when he replaced David Parkin in a jointly announced agreement with Fitzroy Football Club to swap senior coaches. Thanks in part to an influx of interstate recruits including South Australians Stephen Kernahan, Craig Bradley and Peter Motley, Walls had immediate success in his first year at the club taking the side to a Grand Final in 1986 and a premiership in 1987. Walls would coach Carlton Football Club for four seasons from 1986 to 1989. During this tenure Walls would complete the third achievement in Carlton Football Club folklore. Winning the 1987 premiership, Walls had become a premiership player (1968,1970 and 1972), and club captain (1977–1978) and premiership coach (1987).

The Blues under Walls made the finals again in 1988 but by mid-1989 they were struggling when Carlton under Walls lost eight of their first ten games. Walls was sacked as Carlton Football Club senior coach after the team lost a home match to the lowly Brisbane Bears in Round 10, 1989. Walls was then replaced by Alex Jesaulenko as caretaker senior coach of Carlton for the rest of the 1989 season, who was eventually appointed full-time senior coach of Carlton. Walls ended his tenure as coach of Carlton Football Club with 84 games (55 wins – 29 losses – 0 draws).

Brisbane Bears 
Walls became the senior coach of the Brisbane Bears from 1991 to 1995. Walls replaced Norm Dare as senior coach of the Brisbane Bears. It took until the early 2000s for Walls's style of coaching to surface as a method that had become outdated, and criticised in the football and wider community. Walls would coach Brisbane Bears for 109 games (30 wins – 78 losses – 1 draw).

It was revealed in the video "Passion To Play" that in Walls first year as Bears coach in 1991, as disciplinary action Walls authorised his players to don boxing gloves and beat 21-year-old teammate Shane Strempel repetitively in the head until he was severely bashed and bloodied after which Strempel quit playing football. Walls' coaching style was criticised about the incident by Kevin Sheedy who has several times questioned his credibility as a football coach.

In his last season, 1995, he had been told after Round 15 that with 4 wins and 11 losses for the season, he would not be re-appointed for 1996. But a major turning point in the season for the Bears soon came. In Round 16, against Hawthorn, Brisbane trailed by 45 points at 3-quarter time and ended up winning by 7, which remains a VFL/AFL record for the biggest 3-quarter time deficit turned into a win.

From there, the Bears continued their run and won 6 of their next 7 games. They found themselves in eighth position, and qualifying for the finals, after being second-last just 7 weeks earlier. They faced Carlton, the top ranked side in week one of the finals, and went down by just 13 points, a monumental achievement considering Carlton won the next two weeks by more than 10 goals to claim the premiership. Despite this turnaround, a change of heart was not considered, and Walls moved to  the following year to coach. Walls was then replaced by John Northey as Brisbane Bears senior coach.

Richmond 
The Richmond Football Club appointed Walls as senior coach for the 1996 season, when he replaced John Northey. In the 1996 season, Richmond under Walls just missed out of the finals where they finished in ninth place with eleven wins and eleven losses. However during the 1997 season, Richmond under Walls struggled and Walls was sacked after a 137-point defeat by the eventual premiers, the Adelaide Crows, in Round 17, 1997. Richmond under Walls also sat 15th (second-last) on the ladder with six wins and eleven losses. Not completing two full seasons of coaching Richmond Football Club, his record at the club stands as 39 games ( 17 wins – 22 losses – 0 draws). Walls was then replaced by assistant coach Jeff Gieschen as caretaker senior coach for the rest of the 1997 season, who was eventually appointed as full-time senior coach of the Richmond Football Club.

Victoria State Representative Side 

Walls returned for one last coaching role, in 1999 he coached Victoria in the state's last ever State Representative game. AFL administrators abandoned state of origin of football as the competition had become a national game with five of the main states fielding teams in the competition, and the risk of injury to players in state representative games became too risky for clubs to warrant their support as well.

Post-football career

Media
At the end of his coaching career, Walls was immediately in demand as a football commentator.  He became a columnist for The Age in Melbourne (a role he continues to fill), and joined the Seven Network providing special comments during AFL matches.  Later he replaced Malcolm Blight on the football discussion show Talking Footy.

When Seven lost the broadcast rights for AFL matches at the end of 2001, Walls was recruited by both Network Ten and the now defunct AFL-dedicated Fox Footy pay television channel.  He provided special comments during match broadcasts, and was a member of Fox Footy's On the Couch with Gerard Healy and Mike Sheahan from 2002 until 2008. He then switched to the One HD Monday night program with Stephen Quartermain to co-host the new football discussion show One Week at a Time. He also commentated for radio station 3AW.

In 2005, Walls was involved in a feud with Sydney Swans coach Paul Roos, after Walls stated that "the Swans can't possibly win the AFL Premiership with Paul Roos' style of coaching". Walls was on the Network 10 commentary team with Stephen Quartermain and Tim Lane when the Swans suffered a 43-point defeat against  at Marvel Stadium, after which they were particularly scathing and critical of Sydney's misbehaviour and overall performance in that match. Current  coach Matthew Nicks was one of the players singled out, and he was dropped following the match; he never played again as he retired before the end of the season due to injury. This proved to be the turning point in Sydney's season, and ultimately they went on to win the flag (reversing a loss to the Saints in the preliminary final en route) after which Roos refused to accept Walls' apology.

Although no longer a television commentator, Walls continued as the "Special Comments Man" for Sports radio station SEN as well as appearing on its Crunch Time Saturday AFL preview program alongside Anthony Hudson, Dermott Brereton and Herald Sun journalist Mark Robinson for two years before retiring. Between 1999 and 2011 he was a commentator for rival radio station 3AW. He has now come out of retirement, providing special comments on matches for Crocmedia.

In 2018, he infamously tipped West Coast to win the "wooden spoon", despite still having many quality players. The Eagles would then go on to be 2nd on the ladder and managed to win the Grand Final.

Honours
In 2006, Walls was inducted into the Australian Football Hall of Fame. His wife Erin, suffering from lung cancer, attended the dinner in one of her last public appearances before passing away on 9 July 2006. With Erin, Walls had three children: Rebecca, Daniel and David. David went on to represent  in the South Australian National Football League (SANFL), but his career was affected by three knee reconstructions.

Walls was inducted into the Carlton Football Club Hall of Fame in 1990, and was elevated to Legend status in 2011.

References

External links
Profile at Blueseum
Profile at Australian Football

Richmond Football Club coaches
Fitzroy Football Club coaches
Fitzroy Football Club players
Carlton Football Club players
Carlton Football Club Premiership players
Australian rules footballers from Melbourne
1950 births
Living people
Brisbane Bears coaches
Australian rules football commentators
Carlton Football Club coaches
Carlton Football Club Premiership coaches
Australian Football Hall of Fame inductees
Three-time VFL/AFL Premiership players
One-time VFL/AFL Premiership coaches